Piz d'Agnel is a mountain of the Albula Alps, overlooking Marmorera and its lake, in the Swiss canton of Graubünden. On the north side of the mountain lies a glacier named Vadret d'Agnel.

References

External links
 Piz d'Agnel on Hikr

Mountains of Graubünden
Mountains of the Alps
Alpine three-thousanders
Mountains of Switzerland
Bever, Switzerland
Surses